Bobb can refer to:

Surname
 Alston Bobb (born 1984), West Indian cricketer
 Columpa Bobb (born 1971), Indigenous Canadian photographer, actress, playwright, and poet
 Euric Bobb (born 1943), economist and former 400 m runner from Trinidad and Tobago
 Jason Bobb (born 1974), American Inventor and Business Entrepreneur 
 Jeremy Bobb (born 1981), American actor
 Louisa Bobb (born 1969), stage name Gabrielle (singer), British singer and songwriter
 Nelson Bobb (1924–2003), American basketball player
 Randy Bobb (1948–1982), American Major League Baseball player
 Robert Bobb (born 1945), American local government official
 Trayon Bobb (born 1993), Guyanese footballer
 Yusupha Bobb (born 1996), Gambian professional footballer

Given name
 Bobb Goldsteinn (born 1936), American showman, songwriter and artist
 Bobb McKittrick (1935–2000), American football coach
 Bobb Trimble (born 1958), American psychedelic folk/outsider musician
 Bobb, an animated ape character in the TV show Cro

Masculine given names